In 2013, there were 32 new This American Life episodes.

Act 1: Is That a Compass, a Map, a Toothbrush, and a Bottle of Purell in Your Pocket, or Are You Just Happy to See Me?
Act 2: Some Like It Dot

Act 1: Dead Ringer
Act 2: In Country, in City

Act 1: Petticoats in a Twist
Act 2: Maul in the Family

Act 1: Best Laid Plans
Act 2: 21 Chump Street
Act 3: Cold Stone Dreamery
Act 4: My Girlfriend's Boyfriend

Act 1: Rules to Live By
Act 2: A Tiny Office on the Second Floor
Act 3: Game Day

Act 1: The Eyewitness
Act 2: Your Name Written on Me
Act 3: Get Your Own Gun
Act 4: Devonte, Part Two
Act 5: Reverse Turnaround Backflip

Act 1: Grandmas
Act 2: In God We Trust
Act 3: Brother, Can You Spare a Dime?
Act 4: Act Four
Act 5: What Are the Chances?

Act 1: Act One
Act 2: Act Two

Act 1: I Know I Am But What Are You?
Act 2: A Tribe Called Rest
Act 3: I Am Curious Yellow

Act 1: Act One
Act 2: Act Two

Act 1: Photo Op
Act 2: A Picture Is Worth a Thousand... Dollars

Act 1: The Slowest Distance Between Two Points
Act 2: Car Pool
Act 3: Let's See How Fast This Baby Will Go

Act 1: The CO2 in CO
Act 2: The Right Man for the Job
Act 3: Find an Enemy

Act 1: 2011
Act 2: 2013

Act 1: Act One
Act 2: Act Two
Act 3: Act Three
Act 4: Act Four
Act 5: Act Five
Act 6: Act Six
Act 7: Act Seven

Act 1: Breaking the Ice
Act 2: The Gun Thing You're Not Supposed to Do
Act 3: Out of the Woods

Act 1: Reluctant Sailor
Act 2: Emails from a Dead Man

A special retrospective episode featuring the producers' favorite segments from the previous 499 episodes.
Act 1:
#107, "Trail of Tears"
#220, "Testosterone"
#296, "After the Flood"
#232, "The Real Story"
#266, "I'm From the Private Sector and I'm Here to Help"
#334, "Duty Calls"
#314, "It's Never Over"
Act 2:
#27, "The Cruelty of Children"
#188, "Kid Logic"
#94, "How To"
#241, "20 Acts in 60 Minutes"

Act 1: Weeds of Discontent
Act 2: The Real Housewife of Ciudad Juarez
Act 3: Movin On Up

Act 1: Act One
Act 2: Act Two

Act 1: Money for Nothing and Your Cows for Free
Act 2: Nipped in the Bud

Act 1: The Old College Try
Act 2: My Ames Is True

Act 1: Act 1
Act 2: Act 2

Act 1: You Can't Handle The Truth
Act 2: Tiger, Tiger, Burning Bright
Act 3: The Blonde Avenger

Act 1: Kim Possible
Act 2: You Don't Say

Act 1: Invisible Man Vs. Hawkman
Act 2: Wonder Woman
Act 3: The Green Team Of Boy Millionaires, Beppo The Amazing Supermonkey From Planet Krypton, And The Man From Sram
Act 4: Villain And Able

Act 1: Doe-ppelgangers
Act 2: What Are You Doing For The Test Of Your Life?
Act 3: There's A Signed Line Between Love And Hate

Act 1: Opening Night
Act 2: What We Wanted To Do
Act 3: Squirrel Cop
Act 4: Fiascos As A Force For Good In The World

Act 1: Period
Act 2: Diet
Act 3: Health
Act 4: Sleep
Act 5: Dream
Act 6: Route Talk

Act 1: Rental Gymnastics
Act 2: The Missionary

Act 1: Act 1
Act 2: Act 2
Act 3: Act 3
Act 4: Act 4
Act 5: Act 5
Act 6: Act 6
Act 7: Act 7
Act 8: Act 8
Act 9: Act 9
Act 10: Act 10

Act 1: Replacement Claus
Act 2: It's Your Junk In A Box
Act 3: Christmas Or Bust

References

External links
This American Lifes radio archive for 2013

2013
This American Life
This American Life